The Gran Canaria giant rat (Canariomys tamarani) is an extinct species of rat endemic to the island of Gran Canaria (Canary Islands, Spain).

This rodent is known from Holocene to pre-Hispanic fossil remains found at several places on the island of Gran Canaria, the youngest of which have been dated to shortly before the beginning of the Common Era. This species was previously listed on the 2000 IUCN Red List of Threatened Species as extinct, but was removed from the list because it is now considered to have gone extinct before 1500 AD.

The giant rat was herbivorous and terrestrial, with some digging skills and the ability to climb trees.

The giant rat's estimated head and body length were respectively 287 mm and 200 mm, and its average bodyweight is believed to have ranged from 750g to 1200g.

Another giant rat of the Canary Islands was the Tenerife giant rat, Canariomys bravoi. It is believed that the arrival of humans and the introduction of feral dogs led to the extinction of both species.

See also 
 List of extinct animals
 List of extinct animals of Europe

References

External links 

 The Extinction Website

Mammals of the Canary Islands
Extinct rodents
Canariomys
Holocene extinctions
Prehistoric murids
Endemic fauna of the Canary Islands
Fauna of Gran Canaria